The 1991–92 Gonzaga Bulldogs men's basketball team represented Gonzaga University in the West Coast Conference (WCC) during the 1991–92 NCAA Division I men's basketball season. Led by tenth-year head coach Dan Fitzgerald, the Bulldogs were  overall in the regular season  and played their home games on campus at the Charlotte Y. Martin Centre in Spokane, Washington.

Postseason results

|-
!colspan=6 style=| WCC tournament

References

External links
Sports Reference – Gonzaga Bulldogs men's basketball – 1991–92 season

Gonzaga Bulldogs men's basketball seasons
Gonzaga
1991 in sports in Washington (state)
1992 in sports in Washington (state)